The Taipei Performing Arts Center (TPAC) is a performance center in Shilin District, Taipei, Taiwan.

History
The construction of the center began on 28 February 2012. The center construction topped out on 27 August 2014. On 31 August 2016, the center facade was revealed. The structure was constructed with a cost of NT$5.4 billion. On 11 January 2022, it was announced that the center will have its trial opening in March–May 2022.

Architecture
The center was designed by David Gianotten and Rem Koolhaas at Office for Metropolitan Architecture. It has geometrical shapes with a total space area of 50,000 m2. At the center, there is a cube-shaped structure. It also consists the sphere-shaped playhouse which has a capacity of 800 seats. The Grand Theater is an asymmetrical-shaped building which has a capacity of 1,500 seats. The Blue Theater for experimental performances has a capacity of 840 seats. The building is owned by the Department of Cultural Affairs, Taipei City Government.

Transportation
The center is accessible from Jiantan Station of Taipei Metro.

Gallery

See also
 List of tourist attractions in Taiwan

References

External links

 

Buildings and structures under construction in Taiwan
Performing arts centers in Taiwan
Postmodern architecture in Taiwan
2022 establishments in Taiwan